In the mathematical field of potential theory, Boggio's formula is an explicit formula for the Green's function for the polyharmonic Dirichlet problem on the ball of radius 1. It was discovered by the Italian mathematician Tommaso Boggio. 

The polyharmonic problem is to find a function u satisfying 

where m is a positive integer, and  represents the Laplace operator. The Green's function is a function satisfying

where  represents the Dirac delta distribution, and in addition is equal to 0 up to order m-1 at the boundary. 

Boggio found that the Green's function on the ball in n spatial dimensions is

The constant  is given by
 where

Sources

 

Elliptic partial differential equations
Potential theory